Dacheng Law Offices (informally Dacheng) was a multinational law firm headquartered in Beijing, China. In November 2015, Dacheng merged with the global law firm Dentons. At the time of the merger, Dacheng was the largest China-based law firm measured by number of lawyers. According to The American Lawyer's 2012 survey, it was the tenth-largest law firm in the world by number of lawyers, and the largest headquartered outside the English-speaking world.

Dacheng had 41 offices in China, and international offices in Chicago, Los Angeles, Moscow, New York, Paris, Singapore and Taipei. Approximately 94% of its lawyers were based in the PRC.

History
Dacheng was founded in Beijing on 29 April 1992, with five partners, three lawyers and two administration staff.

In 2009, Dacheng joined World Services Group, an international multidisciplinary professional services network of independent accounting, investment banking and law firms, becoming the first China-based member. In June 2009, Dacheng opened an office in Paris and merged with the Los Angeles-based law firm Matthews Wilson Hunter, which was subsequently rebranded as Dacheng. Dacheng formed a joint venture with the Singapore-based law firm Central Chambers in July 2009.

In November 2009, Dacheng received approval from the Beijing Municipal Bureau of Justice to convert from a general partnership into a special general partnership.

Dacheng opened an affiliated office in Taipei in May 2010 and merged with the Guangdong-based law firm Xin Yang Law Firm in June 2010, providing it with its first office in Hong Kong. Dacheng formed an alliance with the Portugal-based law firm PLMJ in September 2010 and opened an office in New York City in October 2010. In November 2011, Dacheng merged with the Chicago-based law firm John Z Huang & Associates, and it was reported that it was drawing up plans for the opening of an office in London.

In February 2013, Dacheng formed an exclusive alliance with the Dubai-based law firm Hussain Lootah & Associates.

In August 2013, Dacheng opened an office in Moscow.

In November 2015, Dacheng completed its merger with global law firm Dentons. The firm is known as Dentons in English and all other languages except for Chinese. In Chinese, the firm is known as 北京大成律师事务所.[11] The firm is decentralised and has no headquarters.

In March 2018, Dacheng started a mutual cooperation with Sarasa Law Office in Tehran, Iran. It was the biggest legal event between the two countries, so many legal cases would be solved while China is the first commercial partner for Iran.

Main practice areas
Dacheng's main practice areas included:

Capital markets
Corporate
Criminal
Employment
Financial services regulation
Intellectual property
Litigation and arbitration
Mergers and acquisitions
Real estate
Restructuring and insolvency
Tax

Offices 
At the time of its merger with Dentons, Dacheng had offices in the following locations:

 Domestic
 Beijing
 Changchun
 Changsha
 Changzhou
 Chengdu
 Chongqing
 Dalian
 Fuzhou
 Guangzhou
 Haikou
 Hangzhou
 Harbin
 Hefei
 Hohhot
 Huangshi
 Jilin
 Jinan
 Kunming
 Lhasa
 Nanchang
 Nanjing
 Nanning
 Nantong
 Ningbo
 Qingdao
 Suzhou
 Shanghai
 Shenyang
 Shenzhen
 Taiyuan
 Tianjin
 Ürümqi
 Wenzhou
 Wuhan
 Wuxi
 Xiamen
 Xi'an
 Xining
 Yinchuan
 Zhengzhou
 Zhoushan
 Zhuhai
 Overseas
 Chicago
 Hong Kong
 Los Angeles
 Moscow
 New York
 Paris
 Singapore
 Taipei
 Tehran

See also 
List of largest Chinese law firms
Legal History of China
Chinese law

References 

Law firms of China
Law firms established in 1992
Law firms disestablished in 2015
Chinese companies established in 1992
Chinese companies disestablished in 2015